Marcel Paul Herriot (18 May 1934 – 14 September 2017) was a Roman Catholic bishop.

Ordained to the priesthood in 1960, Herriot served as bishop of the Roman Catholic Diocese of Verdun, France, from 1987 to 1999. He then served as bishop of the Roman Catholic Diocese of Soissons from 1999 to 2008.

Notes

1934 births
2017 deaths
Bishops of Soissons